P. africanum may refer to:
 Peltophorum africanum, a tree species in the genus Peltophorum
 Peridinium africanum, a dinoflagellate alga species
 Poroderma africanum, the pyjama shark or striped catshark, a shark species

Synonyms 
 Pygeum africanum, a synonym for Prunus africana, a tree species